Tennessee's representation increased from 3 seats to 6 as a result of the 1810 Census.

Its elections were held April 1–2, 1813, after the term began but before Congress's first meeting.

See also 
 United States House of Representatives elections, 1812 and 1813
 List of United States representatives from Tennessee

Notes 

1813
Tennessee
United States House of Representatives